DTaP-IPV vaccine is a combination vaccine whose full generic name is diphtheria and tetanus toxoids and acellular pertussis adsorbed and inactivated poliovirus vaccine (IPV).

It is also known as DTaP/IPV, dTaP/IPV, DTPa-IPV, or DPT-IPV. It protects against the infectious diseases diphtheria, tetanus, pertussis, and poliomyelitis.

Branded formulations marketed in the USA are Kinrix from GlaxoSmithKline and Quadracel from Sanofi Pasteur.

Repevax is available in the UK.

Within Japan, the formulation is called  四種混合（shishukongou - "mixture of 4").
Astellas markets it under the クアトロバック ('Quattro-back') formulation, while another is available from Mitsubishi Tanabe Pharma named テトラビック ('Tetrabic').
A previous product by Takeda Pharmaceutical Company has been withdrawn by the company.

References

Combination drugs
Combination vaccines
Diphtheria
Whooping cough
Tetanus
Polio
Vaccines